Simon Mann (born 10 February 2001) is a British professional racing driver currently competing in the FIA World Endurance Championship with AF Corse.

Racing record

Racing career summary 

† As Mann was a guest driver, he was ineligible to score points.* Season still in progress.

Complete FIA World Endurance Championship results 
(key) (Races in bold indicate pole position) (Races in italics indicate fastest lap)

References

External links 

 

2001 births
Living people
British racing drivers
WeatherTech SportsCar Championship drivers
FIA World Endurance Championship drivers
24 Hours of Le Mans drivers
Italian racing drivers
AF Corse drivers
Asian Le Mans Series drivers